The 1870 South Carolina gubernatorial election was held on October 10, 1870 to select the governor of the state of South Carolina. Governor Robert Kingston Scott easily won reelection based entirely on the strength of the black vote in the state. The election was significant because white conservatives of the state claimed it showed that political harmony between the white and black races was impossible and only through a straightout Democratic attempt would they be able to regain control of state government.

Union Reform Convention
The Radical Republican reforms and alleged corrupt schemes initiated by Governor Scott after he assumed office in 1868 infuriated the white population of the state. However, the Democratic Party of the state was so thoroughly defeated in the previous gubernatorial election that white conservatives realized the only way to seriously contest the election of 1870 was through the formation of a new political party. They organized a conference in Columbia on March 16 to formulate policies for the upcoming campaign. From the results of the previous election, white conservatives concluded that running a white supremacist campaign in a state where African-Americans were in the majority was futile and ineffective. The conference adopted two policies that would recognize African-American equality and ensure their protection under the law. The other resolution adopted was a campaign to wage against alleged radicalism in favor of a perception for a good and honest government.

A nominating convention was held in Columbia on June 15 to select nominees for the state offices of Governor and Lieutenant Governor. In addition, a committee was formed at the convention to finalize the platform that the party would run on in the fall campaign. The chairman of the committee, Matthew Butler, submitted a paper with positions that would enforce the Fifteenth Amendment, uphold the existing laws enacted by the Radical Republicans, and to restore their perception of honesty and accountability in the state government. Furthermore, it was recommended that the new political party be called the Union Reform Party of South Carolina. Richard B. Carpenter, called a carpetbagger judge by some was from Charleston and considered of questionable reputation, won the nomination for Governor although he had never sought the position.

Republican Convention
The state Republicans renominated Governor Scott unanimously for a second two-year term at their state convention in Columbia on July 26 and July 27. Policies adopted on their platform included the continuation of support for civil rights and to request Congress to sell public lands in the South to the landless.

Campaign
Republican support was primarily from recently freed slaves. Reports vary as to alleged black militias drilling into the streets with bayonets fixed, threatening anyone who cast a vote against the Republicans. In addition, leaders of the Union League were influential to many African-American Republicans. As a result, violence erupted within the local communities. Additionally, former Governor Orr advocated for white voters to support the Republican ticket because only through the Republican party would reform be achieved and many of their policies were favorable to the white people.

Even though most African-Americans faced grave threats if they opted to support the Union Reform ticket, many sincerely refused to even consider a candidate other than a Republican. One African-American told  white conservatives that "before the war you wouldn't let me join your party and now I don't choose to." It was virtually impossible for whites to convince African-American voters to vote for their candidates because Republican leaders repeatedly pointed out that whites only recognized black suffrage at the point of a bayonet.

Not only did the Union Reform party have a difficult task at attracting African-American voters, it also faced a disillusioned white electorate. The more extreme base of white voters simply were not willing to vote for any political party that allowed for African-Americans to participate as equals to the whites. Wade Hampton returned from his affairs in Mississippi to rally support for the Union Reform cause, but he encountered lukewarm support at best. It was estimated that less than half of the white voters in the state bothered to cast a ballot in the election.

Election results
The general election was held on October 10, 1870 and Robert Kingston Scott was reelected as governor of South Carolina. Turnout for the election was high as Radical Republicans sought to discourage any future attempts of an organized opposition by show of force at the polls. The devastating defeat suffered by the Union Reform Party led to its demise and it never again functioned as a political party. Moreover, white men who had participated in the Union Reform effort felt they had disrespected their honor associating with African-Americans as their political equal.

 
|-
| bgcolor="#ff00ff" |
| Union Reform
| Richard B. Carpenter
| align="right" | 51,537
| align="right" | 37.7
| align="right" | +37.7
|-

|-
| 
| colspan=5 |Republican hold
|-

See also
Governor of South Carolina
List of governors of South Carolina
South Carolina gubernatorial elections

Notes

References
"Abstract from the Election Returns for 1870." Reports and Resolutions of the General Assembly of the State of South Carolina at the Regular Session, 1870-'71. Columbia, South Carolina: Republican Printing Company, 1871, p. 517.

External links
SCIway Biography of Governor Robert Kingston Scott

1870 United States gubernatorial elections
1870
Gubernatorial
October 1870 events